Clavigesta sylvestrana is a moth of the family Tortricidae. It is found in the western and north-western Baltic region, England, France, the Netherlands, Belgium, Germany and Madeira.

The wingspan is 12–15 mm. The  head and thorax  are grey, whitish - sprinkled. The Forewings are  narrow, dark fuscous white with numerous thick obscure leaden-metallic striae ; the straight edge of the basal patch and the vertical postmedian fascia are darker. The apical area is suffused with ferruginous. The hindwings are fuscous. The larva is dull reddish-brown ; head black ; plate of 2 dark brown :

Adults are on wing in June and July. 

The larvae feed on Pinus pinaster, Pinus pinea, Pinus sylvestris, Abies alba and Picea abies. The feeding is confined to a zone usually between one and three meters above ground level.

References

External links
lepiforum.de
Eurasian Tortricidae

Olethreutinae
Moths of Europe
Moths described in 1850